Ādolfs Alunāns Theatre is a theatre in Jelgava, Latvia that was established in 1896.

References

Theatres in Latvia
1896 establishments in the Russian Empire
Buildings and structures in Jelgava